Johann von Schönenberg (1525–1599) was the Archbishop-Elector of Trier from 1581 to 1599.

Von Schönenberg was born in Burg Hartelstein in Schwirzheim in 1525.  His father was also named Johann von Schönenberg. He became Domizellar of the Cathedral of Trier in 1538.  He spent 1546-48 studying at the University of Heidelberg and the University of Freiburg.  

On 31 July 1581 the cathedral chapter of the Cathedral of Trier elected Johann von Schönenberg to be the new Archbishop of Trier.  Pope Gregory XIII confirmed his appointment on 26 January 1582.  He was consecrated as a bishop by Ludovico Madruzzo on 12 August 1582. As archbishop, Johann von Schönenberg presided over the Trier witch trials.

Shortly before his death, Lothar von Metternich became his coadjutor archbishop.  He died in Koblenz on 1 May 1599.  He is buried in the Cathedral of Trier.  In 1602, Hans Ruprecht Hoffmann completed a grave-altar at von Schönenberg's tomb.

References

This page is based on this page on German Wikipedia.

1525 births
1599 deaths
John 07